Bruno Piva (born 16 May 1946 in Rovigo) is an Italian politician.

He has been chief physician of pain management at Rovigo Hospital. As a member of the centre-right party The People of Freedom, he ran for Mayor of Rovigo at the 2011 Italian local elections. He was elected on 30 May and took office on 21 June 2011. He resigned on 15 July 2014 after an internal government crisis.

See also
2011 Italian local elections
List of mayors of Rovigo

References

External links

1946 births
Living people
Mayors of Rovigo
Politicians of Veneto
The People of Freedom politicians
Forza Italia (2013) politicians
People from Rovigo